It's Christmas may refer to:

 It's Christmas (Planetshakers album), 2019
 It's Christmas (Mandisa album), 2008
 It's Christmas (Ledisi album), 2008
 "It's Christmas (All Over the World)", a 1985 song by Sheena Easton